The El Paso Times is the newspaper for the US city of El Paso, Texas. The newspaper has an approximate daily circulation of 65,000 and 125,000 on Sundays.

The paper is the only English-language daily in El Paso (when the El Paso Herald-Post, an afternoon paper, closed in 1997), but often competes with the Spanish-language El Diario de El Paso, an offshoot of El Diario de Juárez which is published across the Rio Grande in Ciudad Juárez, Mexico. Because of declining newspaper circulation with the rise of the internet, the El Paso Times has recently expanded its online capabilities and introduced continuous online updates. 

Times prices are $1.50 daily and $2 Sunday. For the Thanksgiving Day/Black Friday Ads edition, its cost is $5.

History

The paper was founded in 1881 by Marcellus Washington Carrico. The Times first published April 2, 1881. It originally started out as a weekly but within a year's time, it became the daily newspaper for the frontier town. 

Gannett bought the Times in 1972. In 2003, Gannett and MediaNews Group formed a partnership between the Times and MediaNews' New Mexico papers, with Gannett as the managing partner. In December 2005, Gannett became a minority partner in the El Paso Times, handing the majority of the partnership and management to Denver-based MediaNews Group. In 2015, Gannett acquired full ownership of the Texas-New Mexico Newspapers Partnership from MediaNews successor Digital First Media. Later that year, Gannett split into two, with one having broadcasting and digital properties (Tegna) and another with newspapers (the new Gannett). The latter retained the Times.

Barbara Funkhouser served as editor of the El Paso Times from 1980 to 1986, the first woman to hold that position. Zahira Torres became the editor of the paper in 2017, making her the second woman and first Latina to lead the El Paso Times.

Sections
The El Paso Times prints news in several sections:
A-section: all-local news cover page, with national, Mexico and international news in the inside pages
Borderland: the metro news page has an all-local cover page as well as neighborhood, New Mexico and Texas news
Sports: local and national sports, with an emphasis in high school and University of Texas at El Paso (UTEP) coverage
Business: local and national business news
Living: local and national feature stories including rotating sections covering senior citizens, religion, popular culture, the arts, books, health, home decor, entertainment news, local music and fashion
Tiempo: a weekly entertainment guide, published on Fridays, which includes concerts, movies, galleries, restaurant reviews and other entertainment related stories
Hot Ticket: published every Wednesday

Other publications
The El Paso Times publishes several other weekly, biweekly and monthly publications:
 El Paso y Más: bi-weekly Spanish news coverage
 TV y Más: weekly television guide and Spanish entertainment magazine
 Cars & Trucks: weekly auto trader guide

Staff

Reporters
The Times, as the paper is known in the city, has reporters covering several beats:
Trish Long, Archives
Aaron Martinez, Courts
Daniel Borunda, Police/Crime
Molly Smith, Education
Vic Kolenc, Business
Maria Cortes Gonzalez, Religion/Entertainment 
Felix Chavez, High School Sports
Bret Bloomquist, UTEP Sports
Lauren Villagran, Immigration

Photographers
Briana Sanchez

Digital producers
Sarah Ann Dueñas 
Aaron Bedoya

Former staff
Steve Almond, American short story writer and essayist
Paul Salopek, American journalist and writer
W. E. "Pete" Snelson, sports editor (1940–1943), later member of both houses of the Texas State Legislature from Midland

References

External links

Official website
 El Paso Times at Portal to Texas History

Daily newspapers published in Texas
Mass media in El Paso, Texas
MediaNews Group publications
Gannett publications
Publications established in 1881
1881 establishments in Texas